Bergen Barokk is a Norwegian music ensemble that specializes in 17th and 18th century Western European music. They are supported by the city of Bergen and Arts Council Norway.

External links
http://www.barokk.no/

Norwegian classical music groups
Musical groups established in 1994
1994 establishments in Norway
Musical groups from Bergen